First View Point is a small point between Cape Roberts and Avalanche Bay in Granite Harbour, Victoria Land, Antarctica. It was named by the Granite Harbour Geological Party, led by Thomas Griffith Taylor, of the British Antarctic Expedition, 1910–13.

References 

Headlands of Victoria Land
Scott Coast